Marissa Niroj (born 26 April 1979) is a Thai former professional tennis player. She is now known as Marissa Kroon.

Niroj, a world top-100 junior, made her only WTA Tour main draw appearance at the 1997 Pattaya Open. She reached a career high singles ranking of 506 while competing on the professional tour.

At the 1997 Southeast Asian Games in Jakarta, Niroj won a silver medal for Thailand in the team event and partnered with Suvimol Duangchan for a bronze medal in the women's doubles.

In 1999 she was a member of the Thailand Fed Cup team and appeared in a total of four ties, winning one singles and two doubles rubbers.

ITF finals

Singles: 1 (0–1)

Doubles: 2 (0–2)

References

External links
 
 
 

1979 births
Living people
Marissa Niroj
Competitors at the 1997 Southeast Asian Games
Southeast Asian Games medalists in tennis
Marissa Niroj
Marissa Niroj
Marissa Niroj